Fraga is the major town of the comarca of Bajo Cinca in the province of Huesca, Aragon, Spain. It is located by the river Cinca. According to the 2014 census, the municipality has a population of 14,926 inhabitants.

King Alfonso I of Aragon died at its walls in 1134 while trying to conquer it during the Battle of Fraga. It was conquered from the Moors by the Count Ramon Berenguer IV of Barcelona in 1149.

The local dialect, called Fragatí, is a variant of Catalan.

History

Sights

Demography

population evolution along the years

See also
Bajo Cinca/Baix Cinca
Grace Fraga (Actress Comedian)
Florida 135, oldest nightclub in Spain

References

External links

Fraga on Diputación de Huesca

Municipalities in the Province of Huesca
La Franja